Robert Lloyd Praeger (25 August 1865 – 5 May 1953) was an Irish naturalist, writer and librarian.

Biography
From a Unitarian background, he was born and raised in Holywood, County Down. He attended the school of the Reverend McAlister and then the nearby Sullivan Upper School. 

He worked in the National Library of Ireland in Dublin from 1893 to 1923. He co-founded and edited the Irish Naturalist, and wrote papers on the flora and other aspects of the natural history of Ireland. He organised the Lambay Survey in 1905/06 and, from 1909 to 1915, the wider Clare Island Survey. He was an engineer by qualification, a librarian by profession and a naturalist by inclination. 

He was awarded the Veitch Memorial Medal of the Royal Horticultural Society in 1921. He became the first President of both An Taisce and the Irish Mountaineering Club in 1948, and served as President of the Royal Irish Academy for 1931–34.

He is buried in Deansgrange Cemetery, Dublin, together with his wife Hedwig. His younger sister Rosamond Praeger was a sculptor and botanical artist.

Achievements

Praeger was instrumental in developing advanced methodologies in Irish botany by inviting Knud Jessen, the acclaimed Danish expert in Glacial and Post-Glacial flora, to undertake research and teaching in Ireland.  This was to lead to the establishment of 'paleoecology' as a distinct field of study in Ireland.

"His" counties

A vice-county system was adopted by Praeger dividing Ireland into forty vice-counties based on the counties. However the boundaries between them does not always correspond to the administrative boundaries and there are doubts as to the correct interpretation of them.

List of selected  publications

 Praeger, R.Ll.  Irish Topographical Botany (ITB), Proceedings of the Royal Irish Academy, Vol. (23) 3rd. series, Vol. 7).
 Praeger, R.Ll. 1893. The Flora of County Armagh. Ir Nat.: II.
 Praeger, R.Ll. et al. 1902.  The exploration of the caves of Kesh, Co. Sligo. Trans. R. Ir. Acad., 32B: 171 – 214.
 Praeger, R.Ll. 1902. Gleanings in Irish Topographical Botany. Proc. Roy. Irish Academy, 24B: 61- 94.
 Praeger, R.Ll. 1901 Irish Topographical Botany: Supplement 1901 – 1905. Proc. Roy. Irish Academy, 26B: 13 – 45.
 
 Praeger, R.Ll. 1929. Report on recent additions to the Irish fauna and flora (Phanerogramia). Proc. Roy. Irish Academy 39B: 57 – 78.
 Praeger, R.Ll. 1932. Some noteworthy plants found in or reported from Ireland. Proc. Roy. Irish Academy. 41B: 95 – 24.
 Praeger, R.Ll. 1934a. The Botanist in Ireland. Dublin.
 Praeger, R.Ll. 1934b. A contribution to the flora of Ireland. Proc. Roy. Irish Academy. 42B: 55 – 86.
 Praeger, R.Ll. 1937 The Way That I Went, An Irishman in Ireland, Allen Figgis, Dublin 1980,  
 Praeger, R.Ll. 1939. A further contribution to the flora of Ireland. Proc. Roy. Irish Academy. 45B: 231 – 254.
 Praeger, R.Ll. 1946 Additions to the knowledge of the Irish Flora, 1939– 1945. Proc. Roy. Irish Academy. 51B: 27 – 51.
 Praeger, R.Ll. 1951. Hybrids in the Irish flora: a tentative list. Proc. Roy. Irish Academy. 54B: 1 – 14.
 Praeger, R.Ll. 1949. Some Irish Naturalists, a Biographical Note-book. Dundalk.

See also 
 Clare Island
 Carrowkeel
 Knud Jessen

Further reading 
Lysaght, S.: Robert Lloyd Praeger – The Life of a Naturalist, 1865–1953, Four Courts Press 1998; .
Collins, T.2006. The Clare Island Survey of 1909 – 1911: a multidisciplinary success. Occ. Publ. Ir. biogeog.Soc.  No.9:155 – 165.
Blaney, R. The Praeger Family of Holywood.  FAMILIA: Ulster Genealogical Review .No.15:91–100.1999.

References

External links

 Profile of Robert Lloyd Praeger from the Irish Universities.
 Robert Lloyd Praeger at the Ulster History Circle.
 Chronology.
 Clare Island survey.
 The first Clare Island survey from the Royal Irish Academy.
 Botanic Gardens *Botanic Gardens PDF
 Botanic Gardens
 Eirdata
 Herbaria United digital images of 621 Herbarium specimens collected by Mr. Robert Lloyd Praeger
 
 
 

1865 births
1953 deaths
20th-century Irish botanists
19th-century Irish botanists
People from Holywood, County Down
Irish nature writers
Veitch Memorial Medal recipients
Presidents of the Royal Irish Academy